Hermelin may refer to:

 Beate Hermelin (1919-2007), German-born experimental psychologist
 Paul Hermelin, French businessman and CEO of Capgemini
 Hermelín, cheese made in Sedlčany, the Czech Republic
 S73 Hermelin, Gepard-class fast attack craft of the German Navy